Per Oscar "Pelle" Edberg (born 13 April 1979) is a Swedish professional golfer and former European Tour player. He was runner-up at the 2008 SAS Masters, the 2010 Saint-Omer Open, and the 2015 D+D Real Czech Masters.

Early life
Edberg was born and grew up in Jönköping, Sweden, as the youngest of four sons to Stefan Edberg, the owner of Hook Golf Club, situated 30 kilometers south of the city of Jönköping. Edberg and his brothers Hans, Jonas and Calle all spend a lot of their childhoods at the golf course. His brother Hans, who also became a golf professional and twice a winner on the Swedish Golf Tour, has always trained and supported him.

Without the possibility to go to college in America or combine golf training with studies at upper secondary sports school in Sweden, Edberg turned professional at 17 years of age.

Professional career
After several unsuccessful attempts at the European Tour qualifying school, Edberg finally gained his tour card in 2004, having played most of that year on the second tier Challenge Tour.

Edberg failed to retain his playing privileges on the European Tour in his rookie season, and after a year of limited opportunities in 2006, regained his tour card for 2007 at final qualifying school. In 2007 he finished tied for 12th place at the 136th Open Championship played at Carnoustie Golf Links in Scotland, and had three top-10 finishes, including a tie for 3rd at the Smurfit European Open. He finished the season ranked in 51st position on the 2007 European Tour Order of Merit.

In 2008 Edberg continued his consistent play, ending the season in 85th place on the Order of Merit, recording his best finish on tour to date along the way, a share of 2nd place at the SAS Masters in Stockholm in his home country.

Having spent 2012–2014 mainly on the Challenge Tour, Edberg re-qualified to the European Tour in 2014 and had the second best year of his career in 2015, finishing runner up in the D+D Real Czech Masters, third at the Porsche European Open and fourth at the Omega European Masters, for a 71st place in the Race to Dubai.

On 4 September 2020, Edberg, at 41 years of age, came back to winning, by claiming his first professional win in 14 years, when he won the TanumStrand Fjällbacka Open on the Nordic Golf League and Swedish Golf Tour, with a 15 under par score, leading wire to wire.

Professional wins (6)

Nordic Golf League wins (5)

Other wins (1)

Playoff record
Challenge Tour playoff record (0–1)

Results in major championships

CUT = missed the half-way cut
"T" = tied

European Tour career summary

*As of the 2019 season.

See also
2006 European Tour Qualifying School graduates
2011 Challenge Tour graduates
2014 European Tour Qualifying School graduates

References

External links

Swedish male golfers
European Tour golfers
Sportspeople from Jönköping
1979 births
Living people